The following location in County Monaghan lacks monastic connection:
 Clones 'Abbey': a ruined non-monastic church (NM)

Notes

References

See also
List of monastic houses in Ireland

Monaghan
Monastic houses
Monastic houses
Monastic houses